SR-17018 is a drug which acts as a biased agonist at the μ-opioid receptor, selective for activation of the G-protein signalling pathway over β-arrestin 2 recruitment. In animal studies it produces analgesic effects but with less respiratory depression and development of tolerance than conventional opioids.

See also 
 Bezitramide
 Brorphine
 J-113,397
 Oliceridine
 PZM21
 SR-16435
 SHR9352
 TRV734

References 

Mu-opioid receptor agonists
Chloroarenes
Ureas
Piperidines
Benzimidazoles